Mansurabad (also Romanized as Manşūrābād; also known as Manşūrābād-e Eyzadī, Manşūrābād-e Rāmjerd, and Sākhtemān Manşūrābād) is a village in Majdabad Rural District, in the Central District of Marvdasht County, Fars Province, Iran. At the 2006 census, its population was 127, in 31 families.

References 

Populated places in Marvdasht County